Miarso is a rural locality (a selo) in Botlikhsky District, Republic of Dagestan, Russia. The population was 3,049 as of 2010. There are 13 streets.

Geography 
Miarso is located 8 km northwest of Botlikh (the district's administrative centre) by road, on the left bank of the Ansalta River. Botlikh is the nearest rural locality.

References 

Rural localities in Botlikhsky District